Street Angel is a 1928 American silent drama film with a Movietone soundtrack, directed by Frank Borzage, adapted by Harry H. Caldwell (titles), Katherine Hilliker (titles), Philip Klein, Marion Orth and Henry Roberts Symonds from the play Lady Cristilinda by Monckton Hoffe. As one of the early, transitional sound film releases, it did not include recorded dialogue, but used intertitles along with recorded sound effects and musical selections.

Street Angel was one of three movies for which Janet Gaynor received the first Academy Award for Best Actress in 1929; the others were F. W. Murnau's Sunrise: A Song of Two Humans and Borzage's 7th Heaven.

The movie received two further Academy Award nominations in 1930, for Best Art Direction and Best Cinematography, making it one of two English-language films to receive Oscar nominations in separate years. The other was The Quiet One, nominated in 1949 for Documentary Feature and 1950 for Story and Screenplay.

Plot
A spirited young woman (Gaynor) tries to prostitute herself and, failing in that, to steal money, to pay for her seriously ill mother's medicine. She is caught in the act and convicted but escapes from her guards, only to find her mother dead. Fleeing the pursuing police, she joins a traveling carnival, where she meets a vagabond painter (Farrell). Though they fall in love, her past will not leave her alone.

Cast
 Janet Gaynor as Angela
 Charles Farrell as Gino
 Natalie Kingston as Lisetta
 Henry Armetta as Mascetto
 Guido Trento as Neri, Sergeant of Police
 Alberto Rabagliati as A Policeman
 Demetrius Alexis as Museum Waiter (uncredited)
 Jennie Bruno as Landlady (uncredited)
 Gino Conti as Policeman (uncredited)
 Milton Dickinson as Bimbo (uncredited)
 Helena Herman as Andrea (uncredited)
 Dave Kashner as The Strong Man (uncredited)
 Louis Liggett as Beppo (uncredited)
 Hector Sarno as Spaghetti Cook (uncredited)

Home video release
The film was thought lost for years, but it is now part of a 12 film collection by Fox that was released in 2008.

References

External links

Street Angel at Virtual History
Still at UCLA Film and Television Archive

1928 films
1928 drama films
American black-and-white films
Silent American drama films
American silent feature films
1920s English-language films
Circus films
Films based on works by Monckton Hoffe
Films directed by Frank Borzage
Films featuring a Best Actress Academy Award-winning performance
Films produced by William Fox
Films set in Naples
Fox Film films
1920s rediscovered films
Transitional sound drama films
Rediscovered American films
1920s American films